Benton Township is one of the twelve townships of Paulding County, Ohio, United States.  The 2000 census found 1,035 people in the township, 694 of whom lived in the unincorporated portions of the township.

Geography
Located in the southwestern corner of the county along the Indiana line, it borders the following townships:
Harrison Township - north
Paulding Township - northeast corner
Blue Creek Township - east
Union Township, Van Wert County - southeast corner
Tully Township, Van Wert County - south
Monroe Township, Allen County, Indiana - southwest
Jackson Township, Allen County, Indiana - west

Part of the village of Payne is located in northern Benton Township along the border with Harrison Township.

Name and history
Statewide, other Benton Townships are located in Hocking, Monroe, Ottawa, and Pike counties.

Government
The township is governed by a three-member board of trustees, who are elected in November of odd-numbered years to a four-year term beginning on the following January 1. Two are elected in the year after the presidential election and one is elected in the year before it. There is also an elected township fiscal officer, who serves a four-year term beginning on April 1 of the year after the election, which is held in November of the year before the presidential election. Vacancies in the fiscal officership or on the board of trustees are filled by the remaining trustees.

References

External links
County website

Townships in Paulding County, Ohio
Townships in Ohio